Qualification for 2015 Malaysia Super Series Premier was held on 31 March 2015.

Men's Single

Seeds

Qualifying draw

First qualifier

Second qualifier

Third qualifier

Fourth qualifier

Women's Single

Seeds

Qualifying draw

First qualifier

Second qualifier

Third qualifier

Fourth qualifier

Men's doubles

Seeds

Qualifying draw

First qualifier

Second qualifier

Third qualifier

Fourth qualifier

Women's doubles

Seeds

Qualifying draw

First qualifier

Second qualifier

Third qualifier

Fourth qualifier

Mixed doubles

Seeds

Qualifying draw

First qualifier

Second qualifier

Third qualifier

Fourth qualifier

References 
 MS Draw Results
 WS Draw Results
 MD Draw Results
 WD Draw Results
 XD Draw Results

2015 BWF Super Series
Malaysia Open (badminton)